Hüseyin Kenan Aydın (born 22 October 1962, in Pülümür, Tunceli Province, Turkey) is a German politician and member of Die Linke.

Professional career 
In 1980 he was employed by Thyssen-Krupp. From 1991 to 2003 he was involved in the workers union IG Metall.

Political career 
From 1983 to 2005 he was affiliated with the Social Democratic Party of Germany (SPD). In 2005 he was member of the parliamentary group Die Linke.  In 2007 he became member of the new founded party Die Linke.

External links 

Biography by Die Linke

References 

1962 births
Living people
People from Pülümür
Social Democratic Party of Germany politicians
Labour and Social Justice – The Electoral Alternative politicians
The Left (Germany) politicians
Members of the Bundestag for North Rhine-Westphalia
German people of Kurdish descent
Turkish emigrants to Germany
Members of the Bundestag 2005–2009